The 1961–62 AHL season was the 26th season of the American Hockey League. The league initiates the James C. Hendy Memorial Award for outstanding team or league executives. The league resumes East and West Divisions. The John D. Chick Trophy is first awarded for the West Division champions of the regular season. The F. G. "Teddy" Oke Trophy is awarded to East Division champions of the regular season. Eight teams played 70 games each in the schedule. The Springfield Indians finished first overall again in the regular season, and won their third consecutive Calder Cup championship.

Team changes
 The Pittsburgh Hornets resumed operations in the West Division.

Final standings
Note: GP = Games played; W = Wins; L = Losses; T = Ties; GF = Goals for; GA = Goals against; Pts = Points;

Scoring leaders

Note: GP = Games played; G = Goals; A = Assists; Pts = Points; PIM = Penalty minutes

 complete list

Calder Cup playoffs
First round
Springfield Indians defeated Cleveland Barons 4 games to 2.
Hershey Bears defeated Providence Reds 2 games to 1.
Buffalo Bisons defeated Rochester Americans 2 games to 0.
Second round
Springfield Indians earned second round bye.
Buffalo Bisons defeated Hershey Bears 3 games to 1.  
Finals
Springfield Indians defeated Buffalo Bisons 4 games to 1, to win the Calder Cup. 
 list of scores

Trophy and award winners
Team awards

Individual awards

Other awards

See also
List of AHL seasons

References
AHL official site
AHL Hall of Fame
HockeyDB

American Hockey League seasons
2
2